Atlas (not to be confused with several other companies who used the same name) was a Greek company based in Rentis that produced three-wheel trucks and other metal structures. In business between 1967 and 1972, it used (often rebuilt) Volkswagen engines, as well as German Ford axles.  Cabs were made of glass-fiber reinforced composite. Two different models were produced.

References 
L.S. Skartsis and G.A. Avramidis, "Made in Greece", Typorama, Patras (2003)
L.S. Skartsis, "Greek Vehicle & Machine Manufacturers 1800 to present: A Pictorial History", Marathon (2012)  (eBook)
G.N. Georgano (Ed.), "The Complete Encyclopedia of Commercial Vehicles", Krause Publication, Iola, Wisconsin (1979).

Defunct motor vehicle manufacturers of Greece
1972 disestablishments in Greece
Three-wheeled motor vehicles